Bob Gobel (born November 16, 1955) is an American football coach.  He served two stints as the head football coach at West Virginia University Institute of Technology in Montgomery, West Virginia, in 1989 and from 1992 to 1995, and as the head football coach at West Virginia State University in Institute, West Virginia from 1990 to 1991, compiling a career college football coaching record of 18–52–1.

Head coaching record

References

1955 births
Living people
West Virginia State Yellow Jackets football coaches
West Virginia Tech Golden Bears football coaches